Yacare XV is a Paraguayan professional rugby union team based in Asunción. The team was founded in 2019 AS Olimpia Lions to compete in Súper Liga Americana de Rugby. Olimpia Lions was an offshoot of the Club Olimpia sports club.

The team was re-branded ahead of the 2023 Super Rugby Americas season as "Yacare XV".

The team's name and logo image are based on yacare caiman, a mid-size species of caiman endemic to Paraguay, Argentina, Bolivia, and Brazil.

Stadium 
Yacare XV plays at the "Estadio Héroes de Curupayty" in Luque which has recently been renovated with a new playing surface in preparation for professional rugby.

Current squad  
The Yacare XV squad for the 2023 Super Rugby Americas season is:

 Senior 15s internationally capped players are listed in bold.

References

External links
 Lions Rugby archive

Rugby union in Paraguay
Rugby clubs established in 2019
Club Olimpia
2019 establishments in Paraguay
Super Rugby Americas